Centamin plc is a gold mining company focused on the Arabian-Nubian Shield. It has offices in London, UK; Mount Pleasant, Western Australia; and Alexandria, Egypt. Its registered office is in Jersey. It is listed on the London Stock Exchange and the Toronto Stock Exchange and is a constituent of the FTSE 250 Index.

History
Centamin was first listed on the Australian Stock Exchange in 1970. In 1999 it acquired Pharaoh Gold Mines, a company that had been exploring for gold in Egypt since 1995, and became "Centamin Egypt". The Company was granted a 160 square kilometre exploitation lease over the Sukari Gold Project in the eastern desert of Egypt in 2005. A listing was secured on the Toronto Stock Exchange in 2007 to raise funding for production and first gold was poured in June 2009. The Company moved to a full listing on the London Stock Exchange in November 2009 and was delisted from the Australian Stock Exchange in 2010. In 2011 it redomiciled to Jersey and changed its name to "Centamin plc".

Operations
The Company operates the Sukari Gold Mine in the Eastern Desert of Egypt, some 700 km from Cairo and 25 km from the Red Sea. First gold was poured at Sukari in June 2009 and commercial production began on 1 April 2010, making Sukari the first modern gold mine in Egypt, a country which in ancient times was a prolific producer of the precious metal.

References

External links
Official site

Companies listed on the Toronto Stock Exchange
Non-renewable resource companies established in 1970
Companies based in Perth, Western Australia
Gold mining companies of Australia
Companies listed on the London Stock Exchange
1970 establishments in Australia